The 2007–08 Australian Athletics Championships was the 86th edition of the national championship in outdoor track and field for Australia. It was held from 28 February to 1 March 2008 at the Queensland Sport and Athletics Centre in Brisbane. It served as a selection meeting for Australia at the 2008 Summer Olympics.

Some distance events were held separately. The 10,000 metres event took place at the Zatopek 10K on 13 December 2007 at Lakeside Stadium in Melbourne, the men's 5000 metres was held at the Melbourne Track Classic on 21 February 2008 at the Olympic Park Stadium, and the women's 5000 metres was held at the Sydney Track Classic on 16 February 2008 at the Sydney Olympic Park Athletic Centre in Sydney.

Medal summary

Men

Women

References

External links 
 Athletics Australia website

2008
Australian Athletics Championships
Australian Championships
Athletics Championships
Sports competitions in Brisbane
2000s in Brisbane